WKHB may refer to:

 WKHB (AM), a radio station (620 AM) licensed to serve Irwin, Pennsylvania, United States
 WKHB-FM, a radio station (103.9 FM) licensed to serve Scottdale, Pennsylvania